The  is a museum located in Aomori, Aomori Prefecture, Japan.  It features works from Shikō Munakata, a woodblock printmaker who was born in Aomori City.  The museum was opened in 1975.

External links
 

1975 establishments in Japan
Art museums and galleries in Japan
Museums in Aomori Prefecture
Aomori (city)